Aethalidae or Aithalidai was a deme of ancient Attica, originally of the phyle of Leontis but after 307/6 BCE, of the phyle of Antigonis, sending two delegates to the Athenian Boule. 

It is not known for certain where it was located, but it was probably close to Eupyridae, Cropia and Peleces.

People
Eteokles of Aithalidai, father of Chremonides

References

Populated places in ancient Attica
Former populated places in Greece
Demoi
Lost ancient cities and towns